Neelavelicham is an upcoming Indian Malayalam language romantic-horror drama film directed and co-produced by Aashiq Abu under his banner OPM Cinemas. It stars Tovino Thomas, Rima Kallingal and Roshan Mathew in lead roles, with Shine Tom Chacko, Rajesh Madhavan, Abhiram Radhakrishnan and Pramod Veliyanad in supporting roles. The film is based on Vaikom Muhammad Basheer's renowned short story of the same name.

Cast 

 Tovino Thomas as Vaikom Muhammad Basheer
 Rima Kallingal as Bhargavi
 Roshan Mathew as Sasikumar
 Shine Tom Chacko
 Rajesh Madhavan
 Abhiram Radhakrishnan
 Pramod Veliyanad
 Pooja Mohanraj
 Uma K P
 Devaki Bhagi

Production

Development 
Neelavelicham is the second remake of Vaikom Muhammad Basheer's short story of the same name, following the 1964 adaptation Bhargavi Nilayam.

The film was announced in January 2021 by director Aashiq Abu on the 113th birth anniversary of legendary freedom fighter and Malayalam literary writer Vaikom Muhammad Basheer, along with a poster depicting an ancient Kerala-style home buried in the darkness and gently glowing with moonlight. The house is surrounded by trees and birds, yet upon closer inspection, the front yard is blood-splattered.

Casting 
Prithviraj Sukumaran, Kunchacko Boban, Rima Kallingal, and Soubin Shahir were initially cast in the project. However, because to their hectic schedules and the COVID-19 outbreak in India, Sukumaran and Kunchacko opt out of the film. It was assumed that Asif Ali will take Kunchacko part. The identical poster was released in March 2022, but with a new cast of Tovino Thomas, Kallingal, Mathew, and Chacko.  It was also stated that Shaiju Khalid was replaced by cinematographer Girish Gangadharan. This film marks Abu and Thomas fourth collaboration, following after Maayanadhi, Virus and Naaradan.

Filming 
Due to the COVID-19 pandemic, the filming was delayed. The pooja and the principal photography of the film was kickstarted on 25 April 2022 in Pinarayi, Thalassery. The film was completed in mid-August 2022.

Soundtrack 
The original songs were composed by M. S. Baburaj. It was remade by Bijibal and Rex Vijayan.

Marketing and release 
The makers published a first look poster featuring Thomas in traditional costume with a white shirt, mundu, and briefcase in his hand, inspecting a dusty room in June 2022, along with the film's December 2022 release date. On 30 July 2022, the second poster of the film, showing Kallingal as Bhargavi in a dance posture with her robe spread like butterfly wings against the backdrop of a serene scenic area, was unveiled. On 1 November 2022, marked as Kerala Day, Mathew greeted his followers with a look poster depicting him seated on the porch outside the house, wearing in a white dhoti and white vest, with spectacles. The release date was postponed to January 2023 and then 21 April 2023.

References

External links 

 

2023 films
Upcoming Malayalam-language films
2020s Malayalam-language films
Indian romantic horror films
Short stories adapted into films